Abdi Waiss Mouhyadin is a Djiboutian middle-distance runner competing primarily in the 1500 metres. He represented his country at the 2015 World Championships in Beijing reaching the semifinals. In addition he won a silver medal at the 2015 African Games.

International competitions

1Did not start in the final

Personal bests
Outdoor
800 metres – 1:47.53 (Mataró 2015)
1000 metres – 2:20.28 (Gothenburg 2015)
1500 metres – 3:36.09 (Sollentuna 2015)
One mile – 3:57.97 (Eugene 2015)

Indoor
3000 metres – 8:01.27 (Stockholm 2016)

References

External links
 

1996 births
Living people
Djiboutian male middle-distance runners
World Athletics Championships athletes for Djibouti
Athletes (track and field) at the 2015 African Games
Place of birth missing (living people)
Athletes (track and field) at the 2016 Summer Olympics
Olympic athletes of Djibouti
African Games silver medalists for Djibouti
African Games medalists in athletics (track and field)
Athletes (track and field) at the 2019 African Games